Raymond Kwok Ping-luen JP (born in 1952 in Hong Kong with family roots in Zhongshan, Guangdong) is the chairman and managing director of Sun Hung Kai Properties, the largest property developer in Hong Kong. He is the chairman of SUNeVision Holdings Ltd. and SmarTone Telecommunications Holdings Limited. He is the youngest son of Kwok Tak Seng, and the youngest brother of Walter Kwok, and Thomas Kwok.

Wealth 
The Kwok brothers are the third wealthiest people in Hong Kong and Greater China Region, just after Li Ka Shing and Lee Shau Kee. Their combined wealth is estimated to be US$17 billion in Forbes' 2011 list of billionaires. Their combined wealth rose to $17.9 billion in 2016. According to Forbes, the Kwok family as a whole is the third richest family in Asia, with a net worth of US$40.4 billion.

Education 
Kwok holds a law degree from Cambridge University, an MBA from Harvard University, an Honorary Doctorate in Business Administration from the Open University of Hong Kong and an Honorary Doctorate in Laws from the Chinese University of Hong Kong.

Bribery charges 
In March 2012, Raymond Kwok and Thomas Kwok were arrested on bribery charges. In March 2013, Thomas and Raymond Kwok pleaded not guilty to corruption charges involving payments and loans to Hong Kong's former No. 2 official Rafael Hui. In December 2014, Raymond Kwok was cleared of all charges, while his brother Thomas was convicted of "conspiracy to commit misconduct in public office."

Election Committee 
In September 2021, the Liaison Office ordered members of the Election Committee to spend 2 hours talking to the public; Kwok spent a few minutes at his booth, and then left.

References

1952 births
Living people
Alumni of Jesus College, Cambridge
Harvard Business School alumni
Hong Kong billionaires
Hong Kong chief executives
Hong Kong real estate businesspeople
People educated at Lancing College
Sun Hung Kai Properties people
Business and Professionals Federation of Hong Kong politicians
Members of the Election Committee of Hong Kong, 2007–2012
Members of the Election Committee of Hong Kong, 2012–2017
Members of the 13th Chinese People's Political Consultative Conference
Members of the National Committee of the Chinese People's Political Consultative Conference
Raymond